Patrice Halgand (born 2 March 1974, in St-Nazaire) is a French former professional road racing cyclist. He was one of only three Festina team riders who were named as clean during the Festina doping scandal during the 1998 Tour de France.

Halgand announced his retirement on 28 December 2008.

Major results

1995
 5th Overall Tour de l'Avenir
 10th Overall Tour du Limousin
1996
 3rd National Cyclo-cross Championships
 3rd Flèche Ardennaise
 7th GP Villafranca de Ordizia
1997
 1st  Overall Étoile de Bessèges
 1st Overall Vuelta Ciclista de Chile
 8th Tour de Vendée
1998
 4th Trophée des Grimpeurs
1999
 1st A Travers le Morbihan
 4th Trophée des Grimpeurs
2000
 1st  Overall Tour du Limousin
1st Stage 2
 1st Trophée des Grimpeurs
 1st A Travers le Morbihan
 2nd GP Villafranca de Ordizia
 2nd Boucles de l'Aulne
 3rd Overall Route du Sud
1st Stage 3
 5th Paris–Camembert
 6th Paris–Bourges
 8th Overall Regio-Tour
1st Stage 5
2001
 1st Overall Regio-Tour
1st Stages 1 & 4
 1st Boucles de l'Aulne
 2nd GP Ouest–France
 3rd Trofeo Melinda
 3rd Tour de Vendée
 4th Cholet-Pays de Loire
 5th Trophée des Grimpeurs
 5th Grand Prix d'Ouverture La Marseillaise
 8th Overall Critérium International
1st Stage 2
 8th Overall Tour du Limousin
 8th Rund um den Henninger Turm
 8th GP Chiasso
2002
 1st Stage 10 Tour de France
 1st  Overall Tour du Limousin
1st Stage 1
 1st Stage 4 Critérium du Dauphiné Libéré
 1st Stage 1 Four Days of Dunkirk
 3rd Road race, National Road Championships
 4th GP de Villers-Cotterêts
 4th Trophée des Grimpeurs
 6th Overall Paris–Corrèze
 9th Tour de Vendée
2003
 3rd Road race, National Road Championships
 3rd Classique des Alpes
 4th Overall Paris–Corrèze
 4th Overall Four Days of Dunkirk
 4th Boucles de l'Aulne
 6th Tour du Haut Var
 7th A Travers le Morbihan
 8th GP Ouest–France
 9th Paris–Camembert
2004
 5th Overall Route du Sud
 10th Trophée des Grimpeurs
2005
 1st  Mountains classification, Paris–Corrèze
 2nd GP Lugano
 5th Tour du Haut Var
 8th GP Chiasso
 9th Overall Tirreno–Adriatico
 10th Overall Route du Sud
1st Stage 4
 10th Overall Étoile de Bessèges
 10th Paris–Camembert
2006
 Tour de l'Ain
1st Stage 4
1st  Mountains classification
 7th Overall Route du Sud
1st Stage 4
2007
 1st Stage 4 Tour de l'Ain
 3rd Road race, National Road Championships
 5th Cholet-Pays de Loire
2008
 1st Stage 5 Tour de Wallonie

Grand Tour general classification results timeline

References

External links 
Profile at Crédit Agricole official website

French male cyclists
1974 births
Living people
French Tour de France stage winners
Sportspeople from Saint-Nazaire
Cyclists from Loire-Atlantique